Clavus putillus is a species of sea snail, a marine gastropod mollusk in the family Drilliidae.

Description
The shell grows to a length of 15 mm. The shell is yellowish white, chestnut-tinted between the slight longitudinal ribs. The tuberculate periphery forms a strong angle on the whorls. The lip is simple and thin. The anal sinus is broad and shallow.

Distribution
This species occurs in the demersal zone of tropical Indo-Pacific along the Philippines and in the South China Sea and East China Sea.

References

 Tucker, J.K. 2004 Catalog of recent and fossil turrids (Mollusca: Gastropoda). Zootaxa 682:1–1295

External links

putillus
Gastropods described in 1845